The Ninth ARMM Regional Legislative Assembly was the last meeting of the unicameral regional legislature of the Autonomous Region in Muslim Mindanao (ARMM). Due to the ratification of the Bangsamoro Organic Law creating the Bangsamoro Autonomous Region which replaced the ARMM, the election of legislators for a tenth meeting of the assembly was cancelled.

Ronnie Sinsuat was the last speaker of the last meeting of the assembly.

Members

See also
Autonomous Region in Muslim Mindanao
ARMM Regional Legislative Assembly

References

ARMM Regional Legislative Assembly by legislative period